Berisina is a genus of flies in the family Stratiomyidae.

Species
Berisina caliginosa (Miller, 1917)
Berisina maculipennis Malloch, 1928
Berisina saltusans (Miller, 1917)

References

Stratiomyidae
Brachycera genera
Taxa named by John Russell Malloch
Diptera of Australasia